"Tomorrow" is a song by French singer Amanda Lear from her 1977 album I Am a Photograph, released as a single the same year. The song was a commercial success and remains one of Lear's biggest hits.

Song information
"Tomorrow" was released as the third single from Amanda's debut album I Am a Photograph in 1977. It is an uptempo disco song, written by Rainer Pietsch, with lyrics by Amanda Lear herself. The single was released by Ariola Records in most territories, by Polydor in Italy, and Nippon Columbia in Japan. The B-side of the 7" single in Italy was "The Lady in Black", and a French-language version of "Alphabet" was released in France. "Queen of Chinatown" was the B-side in Spain, Portugal and Brazil, and "Pretty Boys" in Japan. In Poland, the song was released as a one-sided 7" flexi disc in 1978 by Tonpress.

Amanda Lear promoted "Tomorrow" by numerous TV appearances and the track became one of her biggest hits of the disco era. It reached number 1 spot in Italy in October 1977 and remains her trademark hit in that country.

In 1998, Lear recorded a new version of the song for the album Back in Your Arms which consisted of re-recordings of her old hits. In 2008, she re-recorded "Tomorrow" again, this time in a salsa-flavoured style, for the album Amour toujours, which in fact was an updated version of her 2006 With Love album.

Music videos
Amanda Lear filmed a number of music videos for "Tomorrow". A blue screen video with two backing dancers was produced for Musikladen and can now be found on a 3-DVD box set Das beste aus dem Musikladen Vol. 1, released in 2012. It was directed by Michael Leckebusch. Another clip, produced for Italian television show Odeon in 1977, sees Amanda performing the song in a sport hall, surrounded by young men playing basketball.

Another video was filmed in 1982, also using the blue screen technique, presenting the singer in a golden cage, wearing a tight leopard print catsuit, with huge lipsticks in the background. The clip premiered on 31 December 1982 in Italian TV show Premiatissima, which Lear hosted at that time. It was later used in her 1983 Italian TV special Ma chi è Amanda?.

Track listing

French 7" Single (1977)
A. "Tomorrow (Voulez-vous un rendez-vous)" – 4:10
B. "Mon alphabet (Prélude en C by J.S. Bach)" – 4:00

Italian 7" Single (1977)
A. "Tomorrow" – 4:10
B. "The Lady in Black" – 3:30

Italian 7" Promotional Single (1977)
A. "Tomorrow" – 4:10
B. "Tomorrow" – 4:10

Spanish 7" Single (1977)
A. "Tomorrow" – 4:10
B. "La reina del barrio chino (Queen of China-Town)" – 4:15

Japanese 7" Single (1978)
A. "Tomorrow" – 4:10
B. "Pretty Boys" – 2:55

Polish 7" Flexi Disc (1978)
A. "Tomorrow"

Charts

Cover versions
 Italian punk rock band CCCP Fedeli alla linea has recorded a cover of the song, produced by Mauro Pagani, which was released as "Tomorrow (Voulez-vous un rendez-vous)" by Virgin Records in 1988. Amanda has contributed guest vocals to the new version as well as the B-side song, "Inch'Allah ça va". The single was a minor commercial success and charted at number 40 in Italy. The music video largely consisted of footage of the band performing live accompanied by Lear, set to the studio version of the song. The cover was not included on any of the band's studio albums, and only appeared on their 1994 retrospective double CD Enjoy CCCP, and later on Lear's 2002 compilation DivinAmanda.
 In 2006, Spanish singer Pedro Marín covered "Tomorrow" on his tribute album Diamonds, which included interpretations of Amanda Lear's tracks.
 Ivan Cattaneo recorded the song for his 2010 album '80-e-basta!.

References

1977 singles
1977 songs
Amanda Lear songs
Ariola Records singles
Number-one singles in Italy
Songs written by Amanda Lear
Songs written by Rainer Pietsch